Written and illustrated by Ono Fuyumi, the chapters of the Ghost Hunt manga premiered in Kodansha's shōjo manga magazine Amie in 1998, then moved to sister publication Nakayoshi. After this, the series moved to being published in volumes only. The series was completed in September 2010 with the twelfth and final volume.  The manga was licensed for an English-language release in North America by Del Rey Manga, which has released eleven volumes of the series. Ghost Hunt is licensed for release in the United Kingdom by Tanoshimi.

The series focuses on the work of the Shibuya Psychic Research Center, particularly its teenage manager Kazuya Shibuya and Mai Taniyama, a first-year high schooler who becomes his assistant after his usual assistant, Lin, is hurt while they are working on a case at Mai's school. They are joined by a monk, a self-styled shrine maiden, a medium, and an Australian Catholic Priest. The manga has been adapted into a twenty-five episode anime series by J.C.Staff that premiered in Japan on October 3, 2006 on TV Aichi, where it ran until its conclusion.


Volume list

References

External links
 Official Kodansha Ghost Hunt website 
 

Ghost Hunt chapters